Robert Malcolm Sapp (born September 22, 1973) is an American mixed martial artist, kickboxer, professional wrestler, actor, and former American football player. He is currently under contract with Rizin Fighting Federation. Sapp has a combined fight record of 24–39–1, mostly fighting in Japan. He is well known in Japan, where he has appeared in numerous commercials, television programs, and various other media, and has released a music CD, Sapp Time. He is known there as a gaijin tarento (foreign-born talent). He is currently working sporadically for various MMA promotions in the U.S., Japan, and Europe.

Sapp played college football as a guard for the Washington Huskies with whom he won the Morris Trophy. He was drafted in the third round of the 1997 NFL draft by the Chicago Bears with whom he played for one season seeing no game action before playing with the Minnesota Vikings for another two seasons, only playing in one game. He later began a career in professional wrestling before branching out into mixed martial arts and kickboxing, where he initially enjoyed significant success and popularity before eventually developing a reputation as a tomato can.

American football career
Sapp began his athletic career in high school playing football at Mitchell High School in Colorado Springs, Colorado. He received a football scholarship to the University of Washington, where he won the Morris Award in 1996. He took part in "The Whammy in Miami", the Washington Huskies' upset win over the Miami Hurricanes that broke the latter's 58 game home winning streak.

Sapp was drafted by the Chicago Bears in the third round (69th overall) of the 1997 NFL Draft. He signed with the Minnesota Vikings after being released by the Bears. However, his career took a hit after he was suspended by the NFL in 1998 for alleged steroid abuse. He spent two seasons with the Vikings and only played in one game.

Afterwards, Sapp was left in poverty after being defrauded by his economic advisor, and resorted to working at a funeral home moving coffins to make a living. He eventually decided to pursue a career in professional wrestling on the advice of his friend Mike Morris, who saw a chance for Sapp on it.

Professional wrestling

Early career (2000–2002)
Bob Sapp's professional wrestling career started in NWA Wildside in 2000, before he was quickly contracted by World Championship Wrestling (WCW) as a developmental wrestler. There he started honing his "The Beast" persona, which at this stage was a villainous, feral tarzan-like gimmick, but his development was cut short when the company was bought out by the World Wrestling Federation (WWF). He left professional wrestling for many years, attracted instead to a fighting career under the training of fellow WCW developmental wrestler Sam Greco.

New Japan Pro-Wrestling and All Japan Pro Wrestling (2002–2005)
In 2002, riding his success in K-1, Sapp made his professional wrestling debut for New Japan Pro-Wrestling (NJPW). Introduced as a member of chairman Antonio Inoki's army of fighters, Sapp replaced an injured Yoshihiro Takayama in his October 14 match against Manabu Nakanishi. The two exchanged taunts and attacks on the weeks leading to the match, with Sapp ultimately winning after executing his finishing move, the Beast Bomb, on the ringside, where he left Nakanishi to be counted out. This victory led to many other wrestlers to suggest to take their chance against Sapp, among them Yuji Nagata and Takayama himself, but the American refrained from participating.

Sapp balanced his NJPW appearances with similar ventures in All Japan Pro Wrestling, where he intruded to challenge Bill Goldberg and Keiji Mutoh. He first appeared in Wrestle-1, a copromotion between K-1 and AJPW, where he faced Mutoh's alter ego The Great Muta in November 2002. Sapp defeated him after pinning him with a diving headbutt. He returned to the event in January 2003, where he wrestled his kickboxing rival Ernesto Hoost, yet this time Sapp lost after Hoost's cornerman Johann Vos intervened in the bout.

In October 2003, Sapp returned to NJPW, taking part again of Inoki's MMA army along with Takayama, Kazuyuki Fujita, Shinsuke Nakamura and Minoru Suzuki to face Nakanishi, Nagata, Hiroshi Tanahashi, Hiroyoshi Tenzan and Seiji Sakaguchi. He followed by some team matches along with Nakamura and AJPW's Keiji Mutoh, but his main push would come in his singles career. On March 28, 2004, Sapp defeated Kensuke Sasaki to win the IWGP Heavyweight Championship, becoming the first (and only, to date) African-American to hold the title. After successfully defending the title against Shinsuke Nakamura on May 3 at Nexess, Sapp forfeited the title due to having lost to Kazuyuki Fujita in a mixed martial arts fight.

In 2005, Sapp returned to Wrestle-1, taking part on its inaugural Grand Prix tournament and beating Giant Bernard and Jun Akiyama in road to the finals. However, Wrestle-1 was discontinued before the tournament could win.

Hustle (2007–2008)
On October 16, 2007, Sapp made a surprise appearance at Hustle's Korakuen Hall event, attacking Razor Ramon HG and his partner Wataru Sakata. Sapp aligned himself with Generalissimo Takada's villainous Monster Army. After defeating Razor Ramon RG in his debut match for the company, it was announced that he would wrestle at the Hustlemania Yokohama Arena event. His opponent was later confirmed to be Razor Ramon HG, whom Sapp went on to defeat.

Sapp was later put into a tag team with fellow superheavyweight Monster Bono, but a falling out between the two due to miscommunications in the ring led Sapp to attack Bono with a chair. Sapp and Bono entered a short feud, which culminated with the American's victory and Bono's expulsion from the Monster Army. Sapp then started teaming up with Commander An Jo, eventually entering another feud with Hustle Army member Wataru Sakata. Sapp was defeated by him, breaking his winning streak in professional wrestling. He would try to bounce back by participating in the Hustle Grand Prix 2008, but he was shockingly eliminated by Osaka Pro Wrestling representative Zeus after having beaten Tiger Jeet Singh. After another short rivalry with Genichiro Tenryu, Sapp was defeated in a rematch against Bono as his last appearance for Hustle.

Independent circuit (2008-2012)
In 2008, Sapp began to participate in WWA, a pro wrestling organization in South Korea. On October 26, 2009, Sapp captured the WWA Heavyweight title by defeating Lee Wang-pyo. On July 24, 2011, Sapp made his debut for Dramatic Dream Team (DDT) at Ryōgoku Peter Pan 2011, using a "Beast will fight for money" gimmick. In a comedy match, he was defeated by Danshoku Dino, a wrestler with a homosexual character, being pinned after a kiss and a Gaydo Clutch.

Return to New Japan Pro-Wrestling (2012–2013)
At a NJPW event on December 20, 2012, Toru Yano announced that Sapp would represent the villainous Chaos stable on January 4, 2013, at Wrestle Kingdom 7 in Tokyo Dome. At the event, Sapp teamed with Yano, Takashi Iizuka and Yujiro Takahashi in an eight-man tag team match, where they were defeated by Akebono, Manabu Nakanishi, MVP and Strong Man. Sapp made another appearance for New Japan on April 7, 2013, at Invasion Attack, where he and Chaos stablemates Takashi Iizuka, Tomohiro Ishii and Yoshi-Hashi were defeated by Akebono, Hiroyoshi Tenzan, Manabu Nakanishi and Super Strong Machine in another eight-man tag team match.

Wrestle-1 (2013)
On September 8, Sapp took part in the Wrestle-1 promotion's inaugural event, teaming with Keiji Mutoh in a main event tag team match, where they defeated René Duprée and Zodiac.

Inoki Genome Federation (2014)
In 2014, he would compete in the Inoki Genome Federation (IGF) and would lose to Aztecaser in his debut match.

Kickboxing and mixed martial arts career
In 2002, after Sapp was released from WCW, he was picked up by FX for its amateur boxing show The Toughman Competition. Sapp was pitted against William "The Refrigerator" Perry as a pro wrestling representative and, despite not having any prior boxing experience, won by knocking out Perry in round 2. Then Sapp's friend and trainer Sam Greco showed his match to Kazuyoshi Ishii, chairman of Japanese kickboxing promotion K-1. Ishii then invited Sapp to Japan in order to start a career in the ring, seeing a combination of great potential and great marketability in him. After training for six months in United States in the AMC Pankration and Team Quest gyms, he would be sent to mixed martial arts company Pride Fighting Championship, which had expressed interest on him too, in order to make his professional debut first under such rules. Sapp competed under both rulesets indistinctly for the rest of his career, usually for the promotion K-1.

K-1 and Japanese promotions

2002
After arriving to Japan, Sapp debuted in Pride as a K-1 representative against former professional wrestler and longtime Fighting Network RINGS competitor Yoshihisa Yamamoto, who he finished by TKO at 2:44 of the first round by way of wild hooks. The bout, which attracted 10 million viewers, quickly turned Sapp into a fan favorite due to his size, charisma and aggression, and prepared him for his kickboxing debut against Tsuyoshi Nakasako a month later. Sapp lost by disqualification in 1:30 when he pushed Nakasako to the corner, threw him to the ground and rained illegal strikes on him until being restrained by ring crew. The act caused a brawl on the ring when the cornermen jumped in, but Sapp was surprisingly received with cheers from the crowd. He became an overnight sensation in Japan afterwards, appearing on numerous television shows and advertisements and becoming K-1's most popular fighter. Sapp contributed by creating an outrageous public persona, nicknamed "The Beast", under which he played an unhinged, loudmouthed, yet also humorous version of himself.

Sapp's second Pride match was against two-time RINGS Openweight Champion Kiyoshi Tamura. Though Tamura was a highly respected fighter who held wins over the likes of Pat Miletich, Jeremy Horn and Renzo Gracie, he was giving up 150 lbs to his foe and was quickly overwhelmed by the much larger American, succumbing to strikes just 11 seconds into the bout.

In a show held by both Pride and K-1 called "Dynamite", Sapp faced then Pride champion Antônio Rodrigo Nogueira. The latter had originally been slated for a kickboxing bout against K-1 fighter Mark Hunt, but negotiations fell out, as Nogueira had proposed to fight two separate bouts under mixed martial arts and kickboxing rules respectively, which was rejected by Hunt. The Pride champion then accepted to fight Sapp as a replacement, noting that "nobody wanted to fight Sapp, and some other Pride fighters already had their fights matched." Due to the usual size disparity, this time amounting to 127 pounds, Nogueira accepted a special rule to ban knee strikes on the ground, making it a more even affair. Despite this, the match would quickly become a memorable battle of strength against technique.

Sapp opened the match almost finishing Nogueira in mere seconds, as the latter charged with a takedown only to be lifted and slammed onto his head. Sapp looked to repeat the technique, but Nogueira managed to avoid it and momentarily ready Sapp for an unsuccessful armbar. Taking his turn, Sapp started punishing him with ground and pound through the Brazilian's guard, nullifying his armlocks by sheer strength and landing powerbombs every time Nogueira tried his trademark triangle choke. The bout continued this way, with Nogueira trying fruitless submissions from the bottom while Sapp grinded him with heavy blows, until action finally slowed down into the second round, as Sapp was unaccustomed to such a long time of fighting. Nogueira, who had endured the beating through impressive will and looked "only half-conscious" according to reviewers, finally pulled a tired Sapp down and mounted him. The Brazilian seized an armbar and, although Sapp blocked it, he had no left energy to resist and had to concede the hold and the match.

The fight received critical acclaim by reviewers, with website Ichiban Puroresu calling it "an awesome fight" and "better drama than any fight this year," Keith Vargo commenting that "victory and defeat were changing sides so fast that either man could have won any moment," and Scott Newman opining it was "probably the best heavyweight fight [he had] ever seen in fact." Mirko Cro Cop, who would defeat Sapp in K-1, was quoted as, "It was the craziest fight I've ever seen. I couldn't believe that 'Minotauro' was able to survive all the things that happened to him. He almost broke his spine. Unbelievable." Sapp himself was praised by his performance, to the extent Pride commentators Stephen Quadros and Bas Rutten speculating he could become a major fighter with only more training. He actually expressed desire for a rematch, but Nogueira, who came from the fight with both cheekbones broken, actively rejected it.

Sapp stated interest in fighting Fedor Emelianenko after he won the Pride Heavyweight Championship from Nogueira, which Emelianenko accepted, though joking he would have to gain 70 kg to face Sapp in even terms. Nothing of this materialized, and Sapp would never again compete in Pride, instead focusing his attention on K-1. When Sapp returned to the kickboxing ring the next month, this time against Cyril Abidi and with K-1 chairman Kazuyoshi Ishii as a special referee, he scored his first kickboxing victory, cornering his opponent and unloading punches and hammerfists on him for the KO.

His greatest in-ring success, though, would come in his match over K-1 legend Ernesto Hoost. They first met at the K-1 World Grand Prix 2002 Final Elimination on October 5, 2002, where Sapp replaced an injured Cro Cop in his bout against Hoost. The latter was expected to win thanks to his experience and technical superiority despite being outweighed by over 100 pounds, but Sapp claimed he would not need more than the first round to defeat Hoost, thus setting up an anticipated matchup. Once the fight came around, all while under a television viewership of 19.8%, Sapp surprised the crowd when he started dominating Hoost effectively through his already known charging strategy. By pushing Hoost against the ring's corners and unloading punches there with all of his strength, Sapp controlled the entire the first round, and still landed controversially three more punches after the bell sounded. After the round, the ring doctor declared Hoost was unable to continue due to cuts, and Sapp was ultimately deemed winner while Hoost collapsed visibly in his corner, fulfilling his previous prediction.

His solid victory over Hoost, much like his dominant effort with Nogueira, proved that the trust put on Sapp by K-1 executives had not been in vain. Sapp would compare his situation to "taking someone off the streets and throwing him into the ring with Mike Tyson and then watching that person win," given how much he had accomplished with so little experience and training. According to future adversary Mirko Cro Cop, Sapp's reputation caused that many potential opponents were scared to fight him, both in Pride and K-1. However, Hoost was reportedly discontent with the match's refereeing, citing the illegalities committed by Sapp, and expressed desire for a rematch.

Two months later, Sapp was slated to fight Semmy Schilt at K-1 World Grand Prix 2002 Final quarter-finals, but an injury suffered by the latter granted Hoost his second chance as a replacement. Sapp declared he would finish him in one round again. The bout would be a more even affair, however, as although Sapp looked to use his familiar strategy, this time Hoost scored a knockdown through two well placed body blows and survived the first round. Hoost followed on this tactic at the second, but Sapp eventually stunned him and knocked him down in return via repeated arm clubs to the head. The fighters went back and forth for the rest of the assault, until a drained Sapp finally managed to corner Hoost and overwhelm him with unanswered haymakers. At this point, referee Nobuaki Kakuda stopped the fight and gave Sapp the win. Those last seconds were a new source of controversy, as while Hoost was receiving continuous punishment, the stoppage still happened before he fell down. A worn Sapp forfeited his place in the tournament due to exhaustion and an injured hand, being ironically replaced by Hoost himself, who went to win the cup.

At the ending of 2002, Sapp fought professional wrestler Yoshihiro Takayama at the Inoki Bom-Ba-Ye event. After rushing Takayama to the ground as usual, Sapp proved he had his own way with basic submissions by transitioning to an armbar from mount, making the wrestler tap out. Their fight reached a 24.5 rating in TV. By this time, Sapp's media schedule had grown up so much that he found himself without time to properly train for his fighting career. His trainer Matt Hume would describe it as, "if he would have had time to dedicate to strict training, he would have been
a better fighter, however K-1 and Bob's priority was media exposure, so we accepted it and worked with it."

2003
Sapp's first defeat came at his fourth match, pitted against former K-1 champion Mirko Cro Cop on March 30, 2003. Despite being dedicated to mixed martial arts at the moment, Cro Cop had accepted the bout due to a lack of fighters willing to matchup with Sapp after his 2002 performance. Sapp also prepared specially for the fight, learning proper muay thai and rumoredly training under Bas Rutten. Although Sapp pushed the fight for a minute, the mobile Cro Cop landed a liver shot and followed with a left hand that broke completely Sapp's orbital bone, making him collapse on the mat and give up while in visible pain. He would need urgent surgery to repair the damage. Both Sapp and Cro Cop later talked about rematching under MMA rules, but this never came to fruition. Before this, Sapp had been placed in an upcoming fight against Francisco Filho, which had to be scrapped due to Sapp being ruled out from competition due to the injury.

A month later, hoping to capitalize on the success of Sapp and others, K-1 made a new fighting division called "Beast" (Sapp's nickname), which featured superheavyweights fighters such as Choi Hong-man. However, the division was stopped after two events due to disappointing reviews and gate takes. Still, Sapp was perceived to play a role in popularizing superheavyweights like Choi or Giant Silva in the sport, which he considered an accomplishment.

In August, Sapp participated in a special K-1 event in Las Vegas, where he went against Ultimate Fighting Championship veteran Kimo Leopoldo. Sapp had trained orthodox kickboxing with fellow UFC champion Maurice Smith for the match, and it could be noted in several powerful punches and knees that stunned Leopoldo. However, Sapp's stamina started to falter, which a slightly better conditioned Leopoldo capitalized on to take his turn, eventually knocking Sapp down at the end of the round. Controversy happened before the second, as referee Nobuaki Kakuda seemed to be deliberately giving Sapp time to recover, but the match continued anyway. Perceiving himself outclassed at a technical level, Sapp decided to return to his old bullrushing style, which paid off quickly by knocking Leopoldo down with a left hand. The UFC fighter tried to return the favor, but Sapp was already en route to overpower him and finally rendered him KO with an unchecked rabbit punch. In a marked contrast to Japan, American audiences booed Sapp.

The event in Las Vegas would not end without more controversy, as the victorious Sapp got in a verbal confrontation with former boxing Undisputed Heavyweight Champion Mike Tyson, who was sitting at ringside. Tyson jumped on the ring after Sapp and caused a brief brawl, after which Sapp and him exchanged challenges for a bout between the two. It was soon announced by K-1 that the match was in talks, with Tyson considering training with kickboxing coach Jacob Duran in case the bout was hosted under K-1 rules. However, Tyson's status as a convicted felon made him unable to get a visa to fight in Japan where the fight would have been most profitable. Other locations for the proposed fight were made, but the fight ultimately never happened.

Sapp returned to Japan in September, facing another superheavyweight, Stefan Gamlin, under MMA rules at K-1 Japan Grand Prix 2003. Despite being outweighed by the first time in his career, Sapp won in 0:52 with a guillotine choke. He continued challenging Tyson, claiming he would knock him out with high kicks, and also proposed a matchup against Francois Botha.

The next month, this time under K-1 rules, he fought Dutch champion Remy Bonjasky at the first round of the 2003 K-1 World Grand Prix. The match started with Bonjasky, famous for his flying knees and kicks, almost falling out the ring when Sapp threw him on the ropes in response to such attacks. The American chased a covered up Bonjasky through the ring while scoring punches and knees, but his opponent eventually bypassed his defense and landed a sharp roundhouse kick to end the first round. Bonkasky kept landing through the second, knocking Sapp down with a combination, but Sapp answered by pushing him to the ground and landing a heavy illegal punch. As Bonjasky refused to continue after the strike, Sapp was disqualified.

At the end of the year, Sapp was involved in a highly publicized matchup at K-1 PREMIUM 2003 Dynamite!! with former yokozuna Akebono Taro, who was doing his debut. The combined popularity of Sapp and Akebono attracted a crowd of 45,000 to the Nagoya Dome and granted the event a 43% viewership (roughly 54 million of the 127 million people in Japan at the time), making it the first time a combat sports event outdrew the NHK music festival Kōhaku Uta Gassen, Japan's traditionally biggest New Year's Eve show. The classical matchup of an American foreigner like Sapp against a Japanese national like Taro, a cultural contraposition, also gained comparisons with Japanese professional wrestling legend Rikidōzan in his bouts against The Sharpe Brothers. The match itself, however, was short and intense. Though outweighed by over 150 pounds, Sapp had the advantage at experience and stamina, allowing him endure Akebono's initially energetic sumo pushes in order to counterattack. He attacked Akebono with low kicks and punching combinations to the head and body, knocking him down twice before finishing him by KO at 2:58. After defeating Akebono, Sapp engaged in another verbal exchange with Mike Tyson about a possible match, although nothing came from it.

2004–2007
Sapp opened 2004 facing Dolgorsürengiin Sumyaabazar, multiple wrestling champion and brother to yokozuna Asashoryu, under a mixed martial arts ruleset at his own event, K-1 Beast. Showing improvement in his MMA technique, Sapp defended from his guard after being taken down, trading short strikes from there and threatening with Kimura locks. Sumyaabazar ended up passing his guard, but Sapp reversed and captured his back, almost closing a rear naked choke, Sumyaabazar had to abandon the match before the second round due to a groin injury. Only two weeks later, he fought against Seth Petruzelli, this time at kickboxing, but the result was similar: although he knocked Sapp down, Petruzelli injured his biceps and was forced to bow out.

After a 0:33 victory over muay thai journeyman Tommy Glanville, Sapp was pitted against wrestler Kazuyuki Fujita at K-1 Romanex. Although the American looked to strike, Fujita scored an early takedown and initiated a grappling scuffle. Sapp looked to defend from the bottom and at one point pursued a heel hook, transitioned into a toehold, but the Japanese escaped to his feet and started delivering soccer kicks with his wrestling shoes to Sapp's head. Fujita kept landing brutal kicks and punches to a desperately covered up Sapp until the latter tapped out at 2:15. After this sound loss, Sapp lost again in a two-round fight against Ray Sefo.

At K-1 Premium Dynamite!! Sapp faced Jérôme Le Banner in a special mixed rules match, in which first and third rounds would be under regular K-1 rules and under MMA rules the second and fourth. Sapp spent the first round covering and guarding up, almost being finished, but he recovered in the second one by taking down Le Banner and raining ground and pound from the mount. He kept the momentum at the third, utilizing a defensive strategy of charging and clinching to neutralize Le Banner; however, most of the action would take place at the fourth and last, which saw the two trading dominant positions and ended with Sapp looking for an armlock. Under the agreed upon rules, the fight was declared a draw. Sapp dedicated the fight to the memory of sparring partner Masaaki Miyamoto's father who had recently died.

2005 would be a fruitful year for Sapp, starting by a win over judo medalist Kim Min-soo at K-1's new MMA sub-promotion Hero's. Although the debutant Kim, clad in a full judogi, managed to cut Sapp with an early punch, the American swiftly overpowered him and knocked him out to punches in a minute. This prepared Sapp for a run to the 2005 K-1 Hiroshima Grand Prix, where he would face three fighters on a single night in order to qualify for the 2005 K-1 World Grand Prix. In a departure from his explosive yet ephemeral performances up to the point, Sapp showcased greatly improved stamina and much better technique, gained both after intensive training under his long time friend Sam Greco.

Sapp met upcoming fighter Yoshihiro Nakao in the quarter-final, where he would fight all three rounds in dominant fashion. Nakao taunted Sapp during the fight, but the American kept landing kicks and knees in addition to his personal bullrushing style, including also previously unseen counterstrikes. After securing a unanimous decision, Sapp advanced round and faced young fighter Hiraku Hori, who had just defeated. This time Sapp increased his aggression and came near to finishing Hori early with a barrage of punches and a cut, but the Japanese resisted and kept him at bay with high kicks towards the end of the first round. The second would see Sapp uncharacteristically standing still and inviting his opponent to charge at him, which he capitalized on to knock down Hori with hooks before finishing him. The final saw Sapp being pitted against Tatsufumi Tomihira, a karateka famous for his own fouls. The American methodically dismantled Tomihira, scoring two consecutive knockdowns in the first seconds and almost finishing him in the last ones with a cornering barrage. After slowing down in the second and third rounds, where they exchanged kicks and punches, Sapp controlled him for a unanimous decision win, taking the victory at the tournament.

In the post-event interview, Greco praised Sapp's dedication, while Sapp himself gave a speech about his tenure. "I've had low points in my career, now this is a high point and I am enjoying it! I think I've proven I belong in K-1." As promised, Sapp won a prize of 5,000,000 yen and a place among the 16 fighters qualified for the K-1 World Grand Prix.

Shortly after, Sapp returned to MMA format for Hero's, where he was pitted against Russian sumo wrestler Alan Karaev. With Sapp's former opponent Akebono in attendance, Karaev surprised the American with aggression and a quick takedown to mount, but Sapp managed to get out after a failed rear naked choke attempt and hold his own mount for a longer time. Restarted the fight on the feet, Sapp knocked Karaev out with a left jab.

Come the K-1 Grand Prix 2005, Sapp was paired against fellow superheavyweight Choi Hong-man in the first round. Choi's large reach and great size allowed him to land hits regularly through Sapp's charges, but the latter pressed on and got an early knockdown by low kicks to the knee. However, although Sapp came aggressively again in the second round, his stamina started faltering, giving Choi the chance to unload multiple punches. Ultimately, a series of wild battles against an already similarly tired Choi were decided in the latter's favor, granting him a majority decision win.

On May 13, 2006, Sapp was to headline the K-1 show in the Netherlands against Ernesto Hoost, in which Hoost had stated that it was to be his last match in the Netherlands before his retirement. Sapp attended all the pre-fight press conferences and even attended the opening ceremonies for the show. It is unclear at the moment as to why, but Sapp pulled out of the event midway through the show. K-1 issued a statement claiming Sapp pulled out due to new demands he brought to promoters during the show. Sapp disagreed with K-1's account of events, claiming the promotion had tried to delay his payment without any contractual safety.

However, he did participate in 2007's K-1 event in the Amsterdam Arena, fighting as a replacement for Remy Bonjasky against Peter Aerts. Sapp lost the fight by KO within 20 seconds in the first round by a knee to the liver.

After his falling out with K-1, Sapp began to get offers from World Wrestling Entertainment as well as Total Nonstop Action Wrestling to work with them, but his K-1 contract prohibited him from going through with any return to the ring. It was reported WWE was considering an angle between Sapp and Chris Benoit in case they managed to clear his contract out, but they were unsuccessful. Sapp finally made a surprise return to the K-1 ring in Japan after a two-year absence against comedian and part-time K-1 competitor Bobby Ologun. Ologun was unable to mount any effective offense as he was quickly run down and overpowered by Sapp in the first round. Afterwards, with his K-1 contract finally done, Sapp signed up with Hustle and focused on his professional wrestling career.

After K-1; turn into a "tomato can"

Since his last matches for K-1 in 2007, Sapp continued his career for small promotions in a limited, non-competitive in-ring way that was described as throwing fights. He would step into the ring after great amounts of promotion, often against upcoming stars and heavily promoted local fighters, only to turtle down and tap out in a few seconds. This routine, labelled in sports as a "tomato can" act, effectively ended his already inconsistent reputation in the sports, attracting large losing streaks and the accusations of "making a mockery of the sport of MMA" and "being a one-man circus". His usual commentator Mirko Cro Cop expressed his belief that Sapp was intentionally allowing himself to lose against very inferior opponents.

When asked about it, Sapp denied he was throwing fights, and claimed he was doing this routine to collect quick paychecks in a late career he did not deem economically worthy to risk his health. He also pointed out a perceived injustice in contemporaneous MMA business, where fighters carrying accolades and important legacies would be left in economic instability after retiring. He explained:

Cage Rage, Strike Force and BAMMA
On February 10, 2007 it was announced by the United Kingdom's Cage Rage promotion that Sapp would appear on its Cage Rage 21 event on April 21, facing Gary Turner. The move was partly a retaliatory one, as the UFC had chosen to run its first British show in years that same night at the Manchester Evening News Arena, headlined by Mirko Cro Cop, Andrei Arlovski and British star Michael Bisping. Though Cage Rage promoter Andy Geer said that the UFC show would not affect ticket sales for CR21, the signing of Sapp was a clear sign that the company knew it would need a superstar draw in order to successfully compete with the American promotion. A few days before the event Bob Sapp pulled out of the scheduled fight. On short notice, Tank Abbott stepped in for Sapp and lost to Gary Turner.

Sapp faced the South African fighter Jan "The Giant" Nortje at the Strikeforce: At The Dome event in Tacoma, Washington, at the Tacoma Dome on February 23, 2008. Sapp was defeated at the 55-second mark of the first round by TKO after receiving an unanswered amount of punches. Sapp then returned to Japan on New Year's Eve 2008 and defeated Akihito Tanaka via first-round TKO.

Sapp lost to Japanese Ikuhisa Minowa at Dream 9 on May 26, 2009, due to Achilles lock. He fought and lost to Bobby Lashley at Ultimate Chaos in Biloxi, Mississippi, on June 27, 2009, due to first round tapout from strikes. On October 6, Sapp stood in for an injured Gegard Mousasi to face Rameau Thierry Sokoudjou in the semi-finals at Dream 11. He lost via TKO (punches) in the first round.

On November 27, Sapp fought against Swedish K-1 veteran Jörgen Kruth. The fight got a lot of publicity in Swedish and international press, but ended with an anticlimax when Sapp's corner threw in the towel after only 45 seconds, after Kruth hit Sapp with a knee to the liver.

Sapp was next going to face Stav Economou at BAMMA 5, but the event was canceled due to extreme weather conditions.

Dynamite, ONE and Legend
Sapp was scheduled to fight at K1 Dynamite!! 2010. He was set to battle Shinichi Suzukawa on New Year's Eve in a Pancrase-style matchup, but pulled out at the last minute due to contract disputes. When questioned about Sapp's refusal to fight on the day of the event, FEG President Sadaharu Tanikawa asked, "Does anyone actually care? I don't know the reasons why, but we did our best to make him fight. He just said he didn't want to. This is typical [of Sapp]." Sapp claims he refused to fight after promoters were contracted to pay him $30,000 for the fight, but Tanikawa only offered him $15,000 after he arrived in Japan for the event.

On February 11, 2012, Sapp debuted for the Asian ONE Fighting Championship promotion. He faced Rolles Gracie at ONE Fighting Championship: Battle of Heroes in Jakarta, Indonesia and lost via submission to strikes in the first round.

Sapp fought in the main event of the Super Fight League's inaugural event, SFL 1, against James Thompson on March 11, 2012. Sapp tapped out due to a Thompson takedown that caused a leg injury to Sapp in the first round.

He also fought Yōsuke Nishijima in Nishijima's retirement fight under kickboxing rules Legend 4 in Kumamoto, Japan on November 17, 2013. Sapp was dropped with a body shot, stood back up but was then finished with body shots followed by couple of right hooks.

Sapp announced his retirement in April 2014 citing that he'd paid off big medical bills and will be retiring with several million dollars in savings (including money doing work outside of fights).

Returning to kickboxing after a nearly two-year hiatus, Sapp appeared at Fight Night Saint Tropez on August 4, 2017 in Saint Tropez, France. He faced Greg Tony and lost the bout via TKO in the first round.

On January 27, 2018, Sapp faced Selcuk Ustabasi at MFC 24. Sapp lost the bout via TKO in the first round.

Rizin Fighting Federation
Sapp had a rematch against Akebono with shoot boxing rules on December 31, 2015 at Rizin Fighting Federation Grand Prix event. Unlike his usual performances, he won the fight by technical decision.

He returned in September 2018 at Rizin 13, where he fought former sumo Osunaarashi. Sapp received intense striking during the first round and was taken down at the second, but he reversed Osunaarashi as they fell and gained top position, from which he controlled the rest of the round. He went to dominate an uneventful last round for a unanimous decision and his first MMA win in nearly nine years.

Boxing
Sapp was said to go up against Mike Tyson in a 8 round exhibition boxing match, however no personal terms were agreed and Tyson fought Roy Jones Jr. instead.

Fighting style
Having no background in martial arts prior to his fighting career, Sapp's fighting style was relatively devoid of technique, and was more so distinguished by an aggressive usage of size and strength, pressuring his opponent's with an unorthodox "bullrush" technique (which he dubbed as "NFL Style"), whereby he would rush an opponent, usually at the beginning of the round, and overwhelm them with a barrage of punches.

Although defined by his brute strength, Sapp's wins over opponents such as Yoshihiro Takayama and Stefan Gamlin showed that he did possess a knowledge of basic submission techniques.

Personal life
In December 2017, it was reported in Japanese newspaper Shukan Bunshun that a woman claiming to be Sapp's girlfriend accused him of domestic violence. She provided photographs of the alleged injuries and told how she had been abused by Sapp for six years. Although the article included an apology message supposedly sent by him, Sapp did not make public comments about the accusation. No civil suit was filed, and no criminal proceedings were announced as a result of the allegations.

Championships and accomplishments

Kickboxing and mixed martial arts
Black Belt Magazine
2003 NHB Fighter of the Year
K-1
K-1 World Grand Prix 2005 in Hiroshima Tournament Winner
Nikkan Sports
Match of the Year (2002) vs. Ernesto Hoost (K-1, December 7)
Wrestling Observer Newsletter
2002 Best Box Office Draw- K-1, PRIDE Fighting Championships
2003 Best Box Office Draw- K-1, PRIDE Fighting Championships
2002 Rookie of the Year- K-1, PRIDE Fighting Championships

Professional wrestling
New Japan Pro-Wrestling
IWGP Heavyweight Championship (1 time)
Nikkan Sports
Wrestler of the Year (2002)
Outstanding Performance Award (2002)
Pro Wrestling Illustrated
Ranked No. 26 of the top 500 singles wrestlers in the PWI 500 in 2004
Tokyo Sports
MVP Award (2002)
World Wrestling Association (Korea)
WWA World Heavyweight Championship (1 time)
Wrestling Observer Newsletter
Most Charismatic (2003)
Best Box Office Draw (2002, 2003)

Kickboxing record

Mixed martial arts record

|-
| Win
| align=center| 12–20
| Osunaarashi
| Decision (unanimous)
| Rizin 13
| 
| align=center| 3
| align=center| 3:00
| Saitama, Japan
| 
|-
| Loss
| align=center| 11–20
| Aori Gele
| TKO (punches)
| Road FC 32
| 
| align=center| 1
| align=center| 0:35
| Changsha, China
| 
|-
| Loss
| align=center| 11–19
| Edson França
| Submission (rear-naked choke)
| OX MMA
| 
| align=center| 1
| align=center| 0:35
| Fortaleza, Brazil
| 
|-
| Loss
| align=center| 11–18
| Aleksander Emelianenko
| TKO (punches)
| Legend Fighting Show
| 
| align=center| 1
| align=center| 1:18
| Moscow, Russia
| 
|-
| Loss
| align=center| 11–17
| Dusan Panajotovic
| TKO (submission to punches)
| Night of the Champions 2012
| 
| align=center| 1
| align=center| 1:28
| Belgrade, Serbia
| 
|-
| Loss
| align=center| 11–16
| Jong Dae Kim
| TKO (punches)
| Road FC 8
| 
| align=center| 2
| align=center| 1:58
| Wonju, South Korea
| 
|-
| Loss
| align=center| 11–15
| Tolegen Akylbekov
| TKO (submission to punches)
| Bushido Lithuania vol.51
| 
| align=center| 1
| align=center| 1:29
| Astana, Kazakhstan
| 
|-
| Loss
| align=center| 11–14
| Soa Palelei
| TKO (punches)
| Cage Fighting Championship 21
| 
| align=center| 1
| align=center| 0:12
| Sydney, Australia
| 
|-
| Loss
| align=center| 11–13
| Mariusz Pudzianowski
| TKO (punches)
| KSW 19
| 
| align=center| 1
| align=center| 0:40
| Lódz, Poland
| 
|-
| Loss
| align=center| 11–12
| James Thompson
| TKO (leg injury)
| SFL 1
| 
| align=center| 1
| align=center| 1:56
| Mumbai, India
| 
|-
| Loss
| align=center| 11–11
| Rolles Gracie
| TKO (submission to punches)
| ONE Fighting Championship: Battle of Heroes
| 
| align=center| 1
| align=center| 1:18
| Jakarta, Indonesia
| 
|-
| Loss
| align=center| 11–10
| Alexander Otsuka
| DQ (illegal slams)
| Accel – Vol. 18: X'mas Seiya Matsuri
| 
| align=center| 2
| align=center| 1:43
| Kobe, Hyogo, Japan
| 
|-
| Loss
| align=center| 11–9
| Maro Perak
| TKO (punches)
| Noc Gladijatora 6
| 
| align=center| 1
| align=center| 3:04
| Dubrovnik, Croatia
| 
|-
| Loss
| align=center| 11–8
| Attila Uçar
| Submission (achilles lock)
| Premium Fight Night
| 
| align=center| 1
| align=center| 0:56
| Vienna, Austria
| 
|-
| Loss
| align=center| 11–7
| Stav Economou
| TKO (punches)
| ADFC: Round 3
| 
| align=center| 1
| align=center| 1:45
| Abu Dhabi, United Arab Emirates
| 
|-
| Win
| align=center| 11–6
| Sascha Weinpolter
| Submission (forearm choke)
| K-1 ColliZion 2010 Croatia
| 
| align=center| 1
| align=center| 2:03
| Split, Croatia
| 
|-
| Loss
| align=center| 10–6
| Rameau Thierry Sokoudjou
| TKO (punches)
| Dream 11
| 
| align=center| 1
| align=center| 1:31
| Yokohama, Kanagawa, Japan
| 
|-
| Loss
| align=center| 10–5
| Bobby Lashley
| TKO (submission to punches)
| Fight Force International: Ultimate Chaos
| 
| align=center| 1
| align=center| 3:18
| Biloxi, Mississippi, United States
| 
|-
| Loss
| align=center| 10–4
| Ikuhisa Minowa
| Submission (achilles lock)
| Dream 9
| 
| align=center| 1
| align=center| 1:16
| Yokohama, Kanagawa, Japan
| 
|-
| Win
| align=center| 10–3
| Akihito Tanaka
| TKO (punches)
| Fields Dynamite!! 2008
| 
| align=center| 1
| align=center| 5:22
| Saitama, Japan
| 
|-
| Loss
| align=center| 9–3
| Jan Nortje
| TKO (punches)
| Strikeforce: At The Dome
| 
| align=center| 1
| align=center| 0:55
| Tacoma, Washington, United States
| 
|-
| Win
| align=center| 9–2
| Bobby Ologun
| TKO (punches)
| K-1 Premium 2007 Dynamite!!
| 
| align=center| 1
| align=center| 4:10
| Osaka, Japan
| 
|-
| Win
| align=center| 8–2
| Kim Jong Wang
| TKO (punches)
| Hero's 2005 in Seoul
| 
| align=center| 1
| align=center| 0:08
| Seoul, South Korea
| 
|-
| Win
| align=center| 7–2
| Alan Karaev
| KO (punch)
| Hero's 2
| 
| align=center| 1
| align=center| 3:44
| Tokyo, Japan
| 
|-
| Win
| align=center| 6–2
| Min-Soo Kim
| KO (punches)
| Hero's 1
| 
| align=center| 1
| align=center| 1:12
| Saitama, Japan
| 
|-
| Loss
| align=center| 5–2
| Kazuyuki Fujita
| TKO (submission to soccer kicks)
| K-1 MMA ROMANEX
| 
| align=center| 1
| align=center| 2:15
| Saitama, Japan
| 
|-
| Win
| align=center| 5–1
| Dolgorsürengiin Sumyaabazar
| TKO (foot injury)
| K-1 Beast 2004 in Niigata
| 
| align=center| 1
| align=center| 5:00
| Niigata, Japan
| 
|-
| Win
| align=center| 4–1
| Stefan Gamlin
| Submission (standing guillotine choke)
| K-1 Japan Grand Prix 2003
| 
| align=center| 1
| align=center| 0:52
| Yokohama, Japan
| 
|-
| Win
| align=center| 3–1
| Yoshihiro Takayama
| Submission (armbar)
| Inoki Bom-Ba-Ye 2002
| 
| align=center| 1
| align=center| 2:16
| Saitama, Japan
| 
|-
| Loss
| align=center| 2–1
| Antônio Rodrigo Nogueira
| Submission (armbar)
| Pride Shockwave
| 
| align=center| 2
| align=center| 4:03
| Tokyo, Japan
| 
|-
| Win
| align=center| 2–0
| Kiyoshi Tamura
| KO (punches)
| Pride 21
| 
| align=center| 1
| align=center| 0:11
| Saitama, Japan
| 
|-
| Win
| align=center| 1–0
| Yoshihisa Yamamoto
| KO (punches)
| Pride 20
| 
| align=center| 1
| align=center| 2:44
| Yokohama, Japan
|

Mixed rules record

|-
| Draw
| align=center| 0–0–1
| Jérôme Le Banner
| Decision
| K-1 PREMIUM 2004 Dynamite!!
| 
| align=center| 4
| align=center| 3:00
| Tokyo, Japan
| 
|-

Filmography

See also 
 List of professional wrestlers by MMA record

References

External links

 
 
 Profile at K-1

1973 births
African-American male actors
African-American male professional wrestlers
African-American mixed martial artists
African-American players of American football
American expatriate sportspeople in Japan
American football offensive linemen
American male film actors
American male kickboxers
American male mixed martial artists
American male professional wrestlers
American sportspeople in doping cases
Doping cases in American football
Expatriate television personalities in Japan
Expatriate professional wrestlers in Japan
IWGP Heavyweight champions
Kickboxers from Colorado
Living people
Mixed martial artists from Colorado
Professional wrestlers from Colorado
Heavyweight kickboxers
Super heavyweight mixed martial artists
Mixed martial artists utilizing wrestling
Washington Huskies football players
21st-century African-American sportspeople
20th-century African-American sportspeople
Mixed martial artists utilizing kickboxing